William Charles Elston (4 December 1897 – 26 September 1968) was an Australian rules footballer who played with Melbourne in the Victorian Football League (VFL).

Notes

External links 

 

1897 births
1968 deaths
Australian rules footballers from Victoria (Australia)
Melbourne Football Club players
Australian military personnel of World War I